Novin Gurung (born 28 April 1999) is an Indian professional footballer who plays as a defender for Rajasthan United in the I-League. He also works in the Indian Navy, part of the Indian Armed Forces since 2018.

Career
Born in Sikkim, Gurung began his career at the Namchi Sports Hostel before joining the Sports Academy of Sikkim. He then joined the Shillong Lajong academy in 2015. He was promoted the first-team before the start of the 2016–17 I-League season. He made his professional debut for the club on 15 February 2017 against East Bengal. He came on as an 82nd-minute substitute for Redeem Tlang as Shillong Lajong drew the match 1–1.

Career statistics

Club

References

1998 births
Living people
Indian footballers
Shillong Lajong FC players
Association football midfielders
Footballers from Sikkim
I-League players
Real Kashmir FC players
East Bengal Club players
Rajasthan United FC players
Gurung people